The 1968 United States presidential election in Alaska took place on November 5, 1968, as part of the nationwide presidential election. Voters chose three representatives, or electors to the Electoral College, who voted for president and vice president.

Alaska was won by Richard Nixon (R-New York) with 45.3 percent of the popular vote against incumbent Vice President Hubert Humphrey (D-Minnesota) with 42.6 percent. Nixon ultimately won the national vote as well, defeating Humphrey and becoming the next President. Former Governor George Wallace (D-Alabama) ran under the far-right American Independent Party ticket, which favored continuing racial segregation within public schools in addition to most other areas of society throughout the Southern United States. Although unsuccessful, Wallace's third-party campaign was one of the strongest in the 20th century, rivaling the performance of Theodore Roosevelt in 1912, Robert M. La Follette in 1924 and Ross Perot in 1992.

Alaska has only voted Democratic once, and that was in the previous 1964 election for incumbent President Lyndon B. Johnson, who did not run for re-election; nonetheless, during the state’s first four presidential elections Alaska was little or no more Republican than the nation at-large. Nixon's 45.28 percent stood 1.86 percent above his national figure and Humphrey’s 42.65 percent a trifling 0.07 percent below his national total. As usual, the Democrats were strongest in the Bering Sea coastal regions: Humphrey obtained a majority of the vote in Bethel Census Area, North Slope Borough, Northwest Arctic Borough and a plurality in Nome Census Area. Defections to Wallace may have permitted Humphrey to win a plurality in Kenai Peninsula Borough, which as of 2022 remain the last time a Democrat has carried this borough; Humphrey also carried Sitka City and Borough and Yakutat City and Borough, which would subsequently vote Democratic only in 1992, 2012 and (Sitka only) in 2016. Nixon won the remainder of Alaska; however he obtained an absolute majority only in the southern boroughs and census areas of Wrangell and Prince of Wales–Outer Ketchikan.

Despite Alaska lying at the opposite end of the country from Wallace's support base in the Deep South, he did not fare badly in the relatively heavily populated areas of Anchorage, the Kenai Peninsula and the Susitna Valley: indeed in Kenai Peninsula Borough Wallace received over twenty percent of the vote. Wallace's 12.07 percent of Alaska's vote was 1.46 percent below his percentage for the nation at-large, but nonetheless his third-greatest outside antebellum slave states and Oklahoma, behind 13.25 percent in Nevada and 12.55 percent in Idaho.

Results

See also
United States presidential elections in Alaska

Notes

References

1968 Alaska elections
Alaska
1968